Carleton County is the name of a former county in Ontario, Canada. In 1969, it was superseded by the Regional Municipality of Ottawa–Carleton. In 2001, the Regional Municipality and its eleven local municipalities (including Ottawa) were replaced by the current City of Ottawa.

History
Upon the creation of the Johnston District in 1800, Carleton County, named after Guy Carleton, 1st Baron Dorchester, was created from portions of Dundas and Grenville counties, comprising the following territory:

In 1824, upon the creation of Bathurst District (with its judicial seat at Perth), Carleton was withdrawn from Johnstown District and divided into two counties, so that its constituent townships were distributed as follows:

In 1838, Carleton was withdrawn from Bathurst District to form Dalhousie District, its judicial seat at Bytown, with the following territorial adjustments:

Pakenham township was transferred to the new Renfrew County
North Gower and Marlborough townships were added from Johnstown District
Gloucester and Osgoode townships were added from Ottawa District

Effective January 1, 1850, as a consequence of the passage of the Baldwin Act, Dalhousie District was abolished, and Carleton replaced it for municipal and judicial purposes. It consisted of the following townships:

Chronology
Also in 1850, all of the townships of Carleton County were incorporated (see list above). Bytown was incorporated as a town, and Richmond became a village.
In 1855 Bytown was renamed Ottawa and became a city.
In 1867 New Edinburgh was incorporated as a village and 20 years later was annexed by Ottawa.
In 1888 Ottawa East was incorporated as a village and would later be annexed by Ottawa.
In 1893 Hintonburg was incorporated as a village. It would be annexed 14 years later by Ottawa.
In 1898 Metcalfe was incorporated as a police village.
In 1903 Manotick was incorporated as a police village.
In 1905 Rideauville, Westboro and North Gower were incorporated as police villages. Rideauville was annexed by Ottawa two years later, and Westboro was annexed in 1949.
In 1908 Rockcliffe Park was incorporated as a police village, while Janeville was incorporated as a village. Janeville would be incorporated as a town in 1913 as the Town of Eastview, while Rockcliffe Park became a full village in 1925.
In 1910 Kenmore and Osgoode Station were incorporated as police villages.
In 1912 Ottawa West was incorporated as a police village and would be annexed by Ottawa in 1949.
In 1922 Overbrook and St. Joseph d'Orleans were incorporated as police villages. Overbrook was annexed by Ottawa in 1950.
In 1939 Hampton Park was incorporated as a police village. It would be annexed by Ottawa ten years later.
In 1955 City View was incorporated as a police village.
In 1956 Stittsville was incorporated as a police village. Five years later Stittsville became a full village.
In 1963 Eastview (now Vanier) became a city.
 In June 1968, the County, together with Ottawa and the Township of Cumberland that was withdrawn from Russell County, became the Regional Municipality of Ottawa-Carleton.

See also
List of townships in Ontario

References

External links
 Carleton County (Carleton Landowners Association)
 The Changing Shape of Ontario: 1951 map of Carleton County

Former counties in Ontario
Former municipalities now in Ottawa